Emil Fabritius (23 December 1874 – 15 June 1949) was a Finnish sports shooter. He competed in the men's trap event at the 1912 Summer Olympics.

References

1874 births
1949 deaths
Finnish male sport shooters
Olympic shooters of Finland
Shooters at the 1912 Summer Olympics
Sportspeople from Helsinki